Santa Cruz Line is a commuter rail line operated by SuperVia. It is a shortening of the old Mangaratiba Branch of Central do Brasil Railway, as this line continued towards the extinct Mangaratiba station, in the homonymous city, located in the coastal region of Costa Verde.

History
The line begins in Central do Brasil station, crossing many dense areas until Deodoro, in the entrance of West Side of the city, from which it crosses many West Side neighbourhoods, until Santa Cruz station.

The stretch between Deodoro and Realengo attends the large military complex located in the region. After that, the line attends peripheral regions with high index of demographic density and low level of Human Development Index (HDI) and crossing important poles of the region, such as Bangu and Campo Grande. It's a line that doesn't operate intercity services, different from other SuperVia branches that head towards other municipalities of Baixada Fluminense, or to the municipality of Paracambi in the region of the Coffee Valley.

It has integration with bus lines from the city in Méier, Cascadura, Madureira, Marechal Hermes and Deodoro stations, exclusively using RioCard. From Central do Brasil towards Deodoro, there are bus lines with integration to Catumbi and Rio Comprido neighbourhoods.

There are integration services with bus lines using exclusively the RioCard in most of the stations. This interchange resulted in an enhancement in the quality of transportation in many West Side neighbourhoods, before limited to the option of buses in Avenida Brasil, which in peak hours can represent an economy of more than 1 hour in journey time.

This line was a large potential of expansion, because it's a region that still has large population growth, being that its main demands of transport to Baixada Fluminense, North Side and Center are well attended by the metropolitan.

The line was integrated with Deodoro Line in June 2020, operating only as a local line service. This decision was taken by SuperVia to reduce trains stops caused by signalling of Deodoro, Santa Cruz and Japeri lines.

Specifications
Santa Cruz Line is electrified with overhead lines of 3,000 Volts, and a variant rolling stock based in many of the old and new trains.

Stations

See also
 SuperVia

References

External links
 SuperVia official website

Railway lines in Brazil